John Edward Allen DEng, DSc, FIEE, FIEEE, FInstP (born 6 December 1928, Devonport, England) is a British engineer and plasma physicist. In particular, he has directly contributed to international dusty plasma experiments in space under microgravity conditions.

Education
Allen gained Bachelor of Engineering (1949), Doctor of Philosophy (1953), and Doctor of Engineering (1963) degrees from the University of Liverpool. His research included experiments with high-current spark discharges involving currents up to
265kA, the highest in any laboratory at the time. He also gained a Master of Arts (1964) at the University of  Cambridge, and Master of Arts (1965) and Doctor of Science (1975) at the University of Oxford.

Career
During 1952–1958, Allen was a science officer and then senior science officer at the Atomic Energy Research Establishment (AERE, Harwell). From 1958–1964, he was a consultant and the Brazilian National Nuclear Energy Commission (CNEN) Laboratory and a professor at the University of Rome in Italy. During 1964–1965, he was an assistant director of research at the University of Cambridge at the invitation of the engineer W. R. Hawthorne. He spent the major portion of his career as a Fellow of University College, Oxford during 1965–1996 (31 years). He was a Reader (1990–1996) and then Emeritus Professor of Engineering Science from 1996 in the Department of Engineering Science at Oxford, when he became an Emeritus Fellow of University College. In 1991, he was editor of the book Gas Discharge Physics with the theoretical physicist Yuri Raizer. He has also been a Visiting Professor in Physics at Imperial College London.

Fellowships and awards
Allen is a Fellow of the Institute of Physics (IoP), the former Institution of Electrical Engineers (IEE, now part of the Institution of Engineering and Technology), and the American Physical Society (APS). He is also a member of the Institute of Electrical and Electronics Engineers (IEEE) Nuclear and Plasma Society. In 2013, a special issue of the Journal of Physics D: Applied Physics was produced in honour of his 75th birthday. In 1998, Allen was awarded the IEE Achievement Medal for Science, Education and Technology. He was also awarded the Distinguished Scientist Award by the International Topical Conference on Plasma Science.

See also
 List of American Physical Society Fellows (1972–1997) (see 1989)

References

External links
 John Allen home page at the Mathematical Institute, University of Oxford
 John Allen M.A., Ph.D., D.Eng., D.Sc. Professor Emeritus at University of Oxford on ResearchGate

1928 births
Living people
Engineers from Devonport, Plymouth
Alumni of the University of Liverpool
Academic staff of the Sapienza University of Rome
Academics of the University of Cambridge
Fellows of University College, Oxford
Academics of Imperial College London
English physicists
Plasma physicists
Fellows of the Institute of Physics
Fellows of the Institution of Electrical Engineers
Fellow Members of the IEEE
Fellows of the American Physical Society